Here's Lucy is an American sitcom starring Lucille Ball. The series co-starred her long-time comedy partner Gale Gordon and her real-life children Lucie Arnaz and Desi Arnaz Jr. It was broadcast on CBS from 1968 to 1974. It was Ball's third network sitcom, following I Love Lucy (1951–57) and The Lucy Show (1962–68).

Background
Though The Lucy Show was still popular during the 1967–68 season, finishing in the top five of the ratings (at #2), Ball opted to end that series at the end of that season, as there were enough episodes for syndicated reruns, and as Ball had sold Desilu Productions (which owned and produced The Lucy Show) to Gulf & Western. Ball, who had stated that she did not wish to continue to star in a show that she no longer owned, also made it known that she did not wish to continue to star in a show unless her two children agreed to co-star, and thus an entirely new show was written for this purpose. Doris Singleton, who played Carolyn Appleby on I Love Lucy, has said she was originally going to be a series regular on the show as Harry Carter's secretary, but the idea was dropped when Lucy brought her children on board with the show. Here's Lucy was produced by Ball's newly created production company, Lucille Ball Productions. Desilu's successor Paramount Television co-produced the first season, but sold its stake in the show to Ball afterwards.

Unlike most sitcoms of the era, Here's Lucy was filmed before a live audience; standard practice at the time was to film an episode on a closed set and add a laugh track during post-production. However, a laugh track was still used to fill any gaps in audience reactions or missed punchlines. The live format was requested by Ball herself, as she believed that she performed better in the presence of an audience.

Premise

The program's premise changed from The Lucy Show. Unlike Ball's character on the previous program — Lucy Carmichael, who originally lived in New York and later moved to California — in her third sitcom, Ball's character of Lucy Hinkley Carter was already living in Los Angeles, and once again bore a name containing "ar" in tribute to her ex-husband Desi Arnaz. In this new incarnation, Lucy was a widow with two children named Kim and Craig, played by her real life children, Lucie Arnaz and Desi Arnaz Jr. (who, in real life, was part of the teen pop band Dino, Desi & Billy). She was employed at "Carter's Unique Employment Agency" by her bachelor brother-in-law Harry, played by Gale Gordon in a role similar to his Mr. Mooney role from The Lucy Show.  Mary Jane Croft, who had been a regular featured player on the last three seasons of The Lucy Show, also became a semi-regular on the new series. Character actress Vanda Barra, who had played small parts on The Lucy Show, was also added to this sitcom and gradually was upgraded. Towards the end of the run of Here's Lucy, Barra became part of the ensemble cast. Ball's longtime costar Vivian Vance also made six guest appearances as Vivian Jones through the series' run.

The series was created by Milt Josefsberg and Bob O'Brien in 1968. They wanted to comically present the "generation gap" struggle between a working mother and her two increasingly independent teenagers. They wanted change this time around and to escape the shows for which Lucy had previously been so well known. They touched upon current events (civil rights, rock music, the sexual revolution and changing gender/sexual mores).

The writers interviewed Lucie and Desi Jr. to allow a more realistic approach to how teenagers acted. In addition, they were given free rein to choose the names for their respective characters.

Cast

{| class="wikitable" style="text-align:center"
|- style="background:#e0e0e0;"
! rowspan="2" scope="col" | Actor
! rowspan="2" scope="col" | Character
! scope="col" | Season 1
! scope="col" | Season 2
! scope="col" | Season 3
! scope="col" | Season 4
! scope="col" | Season 5
! scope="col" | Season 6
|- style="background:#e0e0e0;"
| 1968–69
| 1969–70
| 1970–71
| 1971-72
| 1972-73
| 1973-74
|- 
| Lucille Ball
| Lucy Hinkley Carter
Starring
|- 
| Gale Gordon 
| Harrison Otis "Harry" Carter 
Starring 
|-  
| Lucie Arnaz
| Kim Carter
Starring 
|-
|Desi Arnaz Jr.
| Craig Carter
Starring 
N/A
Guest 
N/A
|- 
|Mary Jane Croft
| Mary Jane Lewis
Recurring 
Regular
|-  
|}

Episodes

Guest stars and notable episodes

Richard Burton and Elizabeth Taylor guest-starred in the 1970 third season opener, in a storyline involving their famous diamond, which becomes stuck on Lucy's finger. Ball and Burton reportedly did not get along, as he found Ball's rigid perfectionism grating; he subsequently wrote about her in extremely unflattering terms in his memoir. (The episode reunited Ball with longtime cowriters Madelyn Pugh Davis and Bob Carroll, Jr. for the first time since both writers had left The Lucy Show in 1964.) Another noteworthy episode was "Lucy Visits Jack Benny." In addition to Benny, Jackie Gleason made a surprise cameo reprising his role of bus driver Ralph Kramden.

During its run, Here's Lucy featured a number of famous guest stars, many of whom were Ball's real-life friends, often playing themselves, including Vivian Vance, Ann-Margret, Milton Berle, Carol Burnett, George Burns, Ruth Buzzi, Johnny Carson, Liberace, Petula Clark, John Davidson, Eva Gabor, Helen Hayes, Dean Martin, Eve McVeagh, Vincent Price, Tony Randall, Buddy Rich, Joan Rivers, Ginger Rogers, Dinah Shore,  Danny Thomas, Lawrence Welk, Flip Wilson, Shelley Winters, Donny Osmond and Patty Andrews.

Ball appeared as herself in an episode in which Lucy Carter enters a Lucille Ball look-alike contest. This episode, designed to cross-promote Ball's then current film Mame, enabled Ball to appear on screen with herself.

Mary Treen was cast as Mary Winters in the series finale, the 1974 episode "Lucy Fights the System".

Proposed spin-off
At the end of the third season, Desi Arnaz, Jr. decided to leave the series to pursue a movie acting career. His character of Craig returned in the fifth-season episode "Lucy and Joe Namath', but after that he never again appeared on the show although Craig was referred to from time to time. With Desi Jr.'s absence, Lucie Arnaz's character of Kim became more a prominent part of the program as well as a strong comedic foil for both Ball and Gordon.

During the fourth season, the producers proposed a spin-off of the show for Kim, titled The Lucie Arnaz Show. The show would have Kim and her friend Sue (Susan Tolsky) live in their own apartment in a building run by Lucy's brother, Herb Hinkley (Alan Oppenheimer), who is very over protective of Kim.
The show was a back-door pilot, airing as the season four finale. The pilot was anticipated to be picked up as a weekly series.

The week before this installment aired, Vivian Vance made her annual (and final) appearance on Here's Lucy in the episode "With Viv as a Friend, Who Needs an Enemy?" Vance had moved back to California by this time and Ball was so thrilled to work with her again that she asked Vance to rejoin her as her comrade on Here's Lucy the following season if her daughter's pilot sold to CBS. However, Arnaz's show was not well received and was not included in the 1972–73 fall lineup. In addition, shortly after finishing the episode with Ball, Vance was diagnosed with breast cancer and then suffered a slight stroke. Lucie Arnaz remained with Here's Lucy until the show ended in the spring of 1974.

The pilot, "Kim Finally Cuts You-Know-Whose Apron Strings", was written by Lucy veteran writers Madelyn Davis & Bob Carroll, Jr.

Cast
Lucie Arnaz as Kim Carter
Susan Tolsky as Sue
Alan Oppenheimer as Herb Hinkley

Lucie Arnaz eventually did star in her own self-named show The Lucie Arnaz Show in 1985 but that was unrelated to the premise of proposed Here's Lucy spin-off.

Ball's real-life leg injury and end of show
In 1972, Ball broke her right leg in a skiing accident and as a result, spent much of the 1972–1973 season in a full-leg cast (this was written into the show, with the Lucy Carter character also breaking her leg). The "slapstick" was toned down for the remainder of the series, given Ball's decreased ability to perform physical comedy as a result of her injury. According to Geoffrey Mark Fidelman, author of The Lucy Book, this was the point where the "Lucy" character was "finally allowed to age."

Physical comedy aspect after Ball's leg injury 
Ball's reduced capacity for physical comedy gave the other members of the cast, such as Lucie Arnaz and featured players Mary Jane Croft and Vanda Barra, a chance to shine. It also gave Gale Gordon's character of Harry a chance to be more sympathetic and affectionate toward Lucy, which had been completely missing since Gordon first joined the cast of The Lucy Show nine years earlier. From this point forward, Lucy and Harry would interact more as friendly in-laws rather than as antagonistic co-workers.

Despite the fact that Ball was in a wheelchair for much of the 1972–73 season, physical comedy was never completely eliminated, and during the recovery, there were small gags that Ball could safely perform with little to no general injury or harm to her leg. Physical comedy returned to some extent after Ball's leg became more fully returned to its prior state, and the physical comedy aspect, while never totally the same on this show, did make a gradual comeback.

Final Season 
In the spring of 1973, Here's Lucy had fallen to #15 in the ratings ─ the first time that a series starring Lucille Ball had fallen out of the top ten. Ball then decided that her fifth season would be her last. A final episode was filmed with Gale Gordon without a studio audience. In that installment, Harry's business was sold and he and Lucy reminisced together (using flashbacks) about their various adventures together. At the end of the episode, they both leave the office. Lucy then leaves a sign that says "closed temporarily", then she looks at the camera and winks. At the last minute, CBS president Fred Silverman convinced Ball to change her mind and return for a sixth season.

Here's Lucy ceased production at the end of its sixth season in 1974, thus ending nearly twenty-three years of Ball appearing regularly on television. It was widely reported at the time that it was Ball's decision not to continue. Both of Ball's real-life children who co-starred on the series had limited their involvement with the show.  Lucie Arnaz chose to leave the series after being cast in the national tour of Seesaw.  Without her children, and with enough episodes in the can for reruns, Ball met with Gordon and CBS, and mutually chose to end the series, despite the fact the series placed at a respectable 29th in the Nielsen ratings. The network was also in the process of reinventing its image, having already replaced much of their "old guard" television product with more contemporary fare such as The Mary Tyler Moore Show, All in the Family, The Bob Newhart Show, and M*A*S*H.  Except for Gunsmoke, which would remain for one more season, Ball was the last performer from TV's classic age who still had a weekly series at the beginning of 1974. Between 1974 and 1978, still under contract, Ball would star in seven television specials for CBS.

Syndication and rights issues
Here's Lucy was not initially offered in syndication when the series ended in 1974 because both I Love Lucy, which was being distributed by Viacom at the time, and The Lucy Show, which was being distributed by Paramount, were still popular in reruns and it was felt that introducing another Lucy series might undermine the success the other two shows were enjoying. This would also have put Ball in the position of competing against her former series and former production company for ratings, since she no longer had control of either I Love Lucy or The Lucy Show after selling Desilu Productions to Paramount’s parent company Gulf + Western.

CBS retained the rights to run the show in daytime. CBS Daytime reran the series weekday mornings from May 2 to November 4, 1977, in the same time-slot that they had previously rerun The Lucy Show from 1968 to 1972, and before that (1959–67) had at various times rerun I Love Lucy. Finally, in the fall of 1981, Here's Lucy was put into broadcast syndication first by Telepictures, and in turn the rights were later transferred to Warner Bros. Television Distribution  (which acquired Telepictures' successor, Lorimar-Telepictures). Here's Lucy was not successful in syndication and was withdrawn in 1985.

Largely forgotten in the late 1980s and early 1990s and rarely carried by the cable networks, reruns of the series were returned to air by Pax TV in 1998. Cozi TV began airing the show on August 11, 2014. The show's current distributor is Paul Brownstein Productions.

The program was shown in Britain by the BBC fairly soon after it was made, in the Saturday tea-time (mid-afternoon) slot, but it has not been shown often since.

It was seen in Australia on the GO! channel from 31 May 2010 until November 2010. For many years prior to that on Australian television, the show was distributed by Pacific Telecasters Pty. Ltd before being later transferred to Warner Bros. Television. It was a perennial favourite seen on the Nine Network from 1968 to 1988 and in 1992 on ABC Television. Prior to GO!, the show screened on Ovation.

As of 2018, the show is available on Amazon Prime Video in Canada. As of 2019, it is also available on Hulu in the United States, and Tubitv.com.

Home media
On August 17, 2004, Shout! Factory and Sony Music Entertainment released Here's Lucy:  Best Loved Episodes from the Hit Television Series.  The four-disc set features 24 original episodes from the series presented uncut and digitally remastered from original color negatives for superior quality, as well as several bonus features.

On March 25, 2014, MPI Home Video—under license from the copyright holders, "Desilu, Too", and Lucille Ball Productions, Inc.—released Here's Lucy: The Complete Series on DVD in Region 1.

In Region 4, Madman Entertainment has released all six seasons on DVD in Australia.

Other releases
In September 2018, Time-Life released a DVD, Lucy: The Ultimate Collection, that contains 14 episodes of Here's Lucy, and which also collected 32 episodes of I Love Lucy, as well as 24 episodes of The Lucy Show, and 4 episodes of the short-lived ABC-TV series Life with Lucy (which had at the time never before been released to home media), plus a wide variety of bonus features.

Notes

References

External links

 
 TVShowsonDVD.com – Here's Lucy DVD news articles
 Here's Lucy Episode Guide

CBS original programming
1960s American sitcoms
1970s American sitcoms
Television series about widowhood
Television shows set in Los Angeles
1968 American television series debuts
1974 American television series endings